Antoine Gilbert Griffet de Labaume (21 November 1756, Moulins – 18 March 1805) was an 18th-century French writer, playwright and translator. He died in Paris aged 48.

Biography 
A writer gifted of the most extensive knowledge and with a talent of great ease, Labaume had a good education and learned, in addition, the English, German and Italian languages. He obtained a modest employment at the Interior Ministry, and made several translations, whose flow increased a little fortune which was quite modest. When this job was taken from him, he lost his fortune. Some other sorrows added to this unfortunate event.

The first work he translated was the novel Épanchemens de l'imagination et de l'amitié by Langhorne, followed by Daniel by Friedrich Karl von Moser, translated from German, 1787, in-18°; Réflexions sur l'abolition de la traite et de l'esclavage des nègres, translated from English, 1788, in-8°; Common Sense by Thomas Paine, translated from English 1790, in-12°; Marianne et Charlotte by Tunger, translated from German, 1794, 3 volumes in-18+; Léopoldine, ou les Enfans perdus et retrouvés by Fr. Schulz, also translated from German ; Tableaux du Déluge, after Johann Jakob Bodmer, 1797, in-18°; the second volume of Histoire des Suisses by Müller translated from German, 1797, 8 vol. in-8°; les Abdérites by Christoph Martin Wieland, translated from German 1802, 3 volumes in-8°; l'Aperçu statistique des États d'Allemagne by Hoek, translated from German, in-f°; le Voyage en Afrique by Friedrich Hornemann, translated from English, 1803, two parts, in-8°; the translation of Recherches asiatiques, 1805, 2 vol.; Anna Bella, ou les Dunes de Barham by Henry Mackenzie, translated from English 1810, 4 vol. in- 12°. He also translated various poems from English, among others several pieces from poet Thomas Chatterton ; Quelques vers, 1785, in-16°, 1802.

He collaborated with several newspapers, including the Mercure de France, the Décade philosophique, the Magasin encyclopédique : the tome III 7e ann., t. Ier, (p. 203) of the last of these collections provides a notice on les Femmes auteurs de la Grande-Bretagne.

In addition, he left two comedies and some light poetry: Galatée, in one act and in verse and Agathis in prose and in verse ; la Messe de Gnide, by G. Nobody, Geneva, 1797, small 92 pages in-18°, licentious work agreeably versified ; la Vie de Daniel Defoe, author of Robinson Crusoe (beginning the Panckoucke edition, 1799, 3 vol. in-8°).

References

Sources 
 Antoine-Vincent Arnault, Biographie nouvelle des contemporains, vol. 2, Paris, Ledentu, (p. 212–3). 
 Georges Touchard-Lafosse, La Loire historique, pittoresque et biographique, Paris, Adolphe Delahays, 1858, (p. 374).

External links 
 Antoine Gilbert Griffet de Labaume on Data.bnf.fr
 La Messe de Gnide, poem (1793).
 Antoine Gilbert Griffet de Labaume on Dictionnaire des journalistes

18th-century French male writers
18th-century French dramatists and playwrights
18th-century French poets
French translators
English–French translators
German–French translators
1756 births
Writers from Moulins, Allier
1805 deaths
18th-century French translators